There was a nominal total of 316 athlete quota places available for boxing at the 2019 European Games; 256 for men and 60 for women.

Qualification rules
Each National Olympic Committee (NOC) is restricted to one entry per event, which equates to a maximum quota of fifteen qualified boxers. Quota places earned through qualification were awarded to the qualifying boxers.

As the host NOC, Belarus was guaranteed athlete quota places for all fifteen categories.

Men
In keeping with procedure for previous European Amateur Boxing Championships, each NOC could simply enter their boxers of choice. There were no category-specific limits on quota places.

Women
Each category was assigned 12 quota places, of which 2 were nominally reserved for host NOC and universality allocations.

Qualification for the remaining 10 was determined primarily by NOC placings in the December 2018 AIBA World Ranking. Any outstanding places were allocated to unranked boxers best placed in the 2018 European Championships, then (if required) the 2018 World Championships.

Unused quota places (including those reserved as above) were reallocated based on performances at the aforementioned championships.

Qualification timeline

Women's events

51 kg (flyweight)

57 kg (featherweight)

60 kg (lightweight)

69 kg (welterweight)

75 kg (middleweight)

References

Qualification
Qualification for the 2019 European Games